Kazimiera Strolienė (born 26 May 1960) is a Lithuanian biathlete. She competed at the 1992 Winter Olympics and the 1994 Winter Olympics. She also competed in four events cross-country skiing events at the 1998 Winter Olympics.

References

1960 births
Living people
Biathletes at the 1992 Winter Olympics
Biathletes at the 1994 Winter Olympics
Cross-country skiers at the 1998 Winter Olympics
Lithuanian female biathletes
Lithuanian female cross-country skiers
Olympic biathletes of Lithuania
Olympic cross-country skiers of Lithuania
Place of birth missing (living people)